Luís Esteves may refer to:
 Luis R. Esteves,Puerto Rican military officer
 Luís Esteves (footballer), Portuguese footballer